Ormond Garfield Sampson (March 3, 1910 – July 2, 1966) was an American Negro league shortstop between 1932 and 1941.

A native of San Salvador Island, Bahamas, Sampson made his Negro leagues debut in 1932 with the Atlanta Black Crackers. He went on to play for the Chicago American Giants, Cleveland Bears, and Jacksonville Red Caps. He died in Miami, Florida in 1966 at age 56.

References

External links
 and Baseball-Reference Black Baseball stats and Seamheads

1910 births
1966 deaths
Atlanta Black Crackers players
Chicago American Giants players
Jacksonville Red Caps players
Baseball shortstops
Bahamian baseball players
Cleveland Bears players
20th-century African-American sportspeople